Augustus Dumbar (born 21 August 1978) is a Liberian former footballer who is last known to have played as a forward for RKC.

Career

In 1997, Dumbar signed for RKC in the Netherlands after training with Ajax, the Netherlands' most successful club.

References

External links
 

Liberian footballers
Living people
Eredivisie players
Liberia international footballers
RKC Waalwijk players
Expatriate footballers in the Netherlands
Liberian expatriates in the Netherlands
Association football forwards
1978 births
Liberian expatriate footballers
Mighty Barrolle players